Confidence is a 1933 Pre-Code animated short subject, produced by Walter Lantz, directed by Bill Nolan, and featuring Oswald the Lucky Rabbit. In the film, Oswald was voiced by multiple voiceactors in this short. Oswald is a farmer whose farm falls prey to the ominous influence of the Great Depression (personified as a dark, shadowy figure). Determined to find a solution, Oswald flies to Washington, D.C. where he meets President Franklin D. Roosevelt. It was released by Universal Pictures on July 31, 1933 and is available on The Woody Woodpecker and Friends Classic Cartoon Collection DVD box set.

References

External links
Confidence at the Big Cartoon Database
The Walter Lantz Cartune Encyclopedia: 1933

1933 films
1933 animated films
1930s American animated films
1930s animated short films
Walter Lantz Productions shorts
American black-and-white films
American political comedy films
Great Depression films
Oswald the Lucky Rabbit cartoons
Universal Pictures animated short films
Cultural depictions of Franklin D. Roosevelt
Animation based on real people
Animated films about animals
1930s political comedy films
1930s English-language films